The 2011 Scottish Women's Premier League Cup was the 10th edition of the SWPL Cup competition, which began in 2002. The competition was to be contested by all 12 teams of the Scottish Women's Premier League (SWPL

First round

Quarter-finals 
Dundee United forfeited their match against Hibernian with the latter receiving a bye into the next round.

Semi-finals

Final

External links
at soccerway.com
at Scottish Football Historical Results Archive

References

1
Scot
Scot
Scottish Women's Premier League seasons